Blepephaeus grisescens is a species of beetle in the family Cerambycidae. It was described by Karl-Ernst Hüdepohl in 1998. It is known from Myanmar ad Thailand.

References

Blepephaeus
Beetles described in 1998